Calliostoma bigelowi, common name Bigelow's top shell, is a species of sea snail, a marine gastropod mollusk in the family Calliostomatidae.

Distribution
This species occurs in the Gulf of Mexico and the Caribbean Sea.

Description 
The maximum recorded shell length is 33.5 mm.

Habitat 
Minimum recorded depth is 375 m. Maximum recorded depth is 375 m.

References

 Rosenberg, G., F. Moretzsohn, and E. F. García. 2009. Gastropoda (Mollusca) of the Gulf of Mexico, pp. 579–699 in Felder, D.L. and D.K. Camp (eds.), Gulf of Mexico–Origins, Waters, and Biota. Biodiversity. Texas A&M Press, College Station, Texas

External links
 

bigelowi
Gastropods described in 1938